15224 Penttilä, provisional designation , is a dark background asteroid from the inner regions of the asteroid belt, approximately  in diameter. It was discovered on 15 May 1985, by American astronomer Edward Bowell at Lowell's Anderson Mesa Station in Arizona, United States. The likely elongated asteroid has a rotation period of 4.4 hours. It was named after planetary scientist Antti Penttilä at the University of Helsinki.

Orbit and classification 

Penttilä is a non-family asteroid from the main belt's background population. It orbits the Sun in the inner asteroid belt at a distance of 1.8–3.0 AU once every 3 years and 9 months (1,372 days; semi-major axis of 2.42 AU). Its orbit has an eccentricity of 0.24 and an inclination of 12° with respect to the ecliptic.

The body's observation arc begins with its first observation, a precovery taken at the Crimean Astrophysical Observatory in April 1970, or 15 years prior to its official discovery observation at Anderson Mesa Station.

Naming 

This minor planet was named for Finnish postdoctoral researcher Antti Penttilä (born 1977) at the University of Helsinki, an expert on light reflection and absorption on the surface of small Solar System bodies such as asteroids and cometary nuclei, as well as of the cosmic dust released by cometary comae. The official  was published on 12 July 2014.

Physical characteristics 

The asteroid's spectral type has not been determined. Due to its low geometric albedo, it likely a carbonaceous C-type asteroid (see below).

Rotation period 

In June 2015, a rotational lightcurve was obtained for this asteroid from photometric observations by astronomer Daniel Klinglesmith at Etscorn Campus Observatory , New Mexico. Lightcurve analysis gave a rotation period of  hours with a brightness variation of 0.55 in magnitude, indicative of a non-spherical, elongated shape. Previously, in August 2012, a concurring period of  hours with an amplitude of 0.46 was determined from observations in the R-band by astronomers at the Palomar Transient Factory, California.

Diameter and albedo 

According to the survey carried out by the NEOWISE mission of NASA's Wide-field Infrared Survey Explorer, Penttilä measures between 7.9 and 9.6 kilometers in diameter and its surface has an albedo between 0.04 and 0.085. The Collaborative Asteroid Lightcurve Link assumes a standard albedo for stony asteroids of 0.20, and hence calculates a smaller diameter of 4.9 kilometers.

References

External links 
 Asteroid Lightcurve Database (LCDB), query form (info )
 Dictionary of Minor Planet Names, Google books
 Discovery Circumstances: Numbered Minor Planets (15001)-(20000) – Minor Planet Center
 
 
 

015224
Discoveries by Edward L. G. Bowell
Named minor planets
19850515